In mathematics, Souček spaces are generalizations of Sobolev spaces, named after the Czech mathematician Jiří Souček.  One of their main advantages is that they offer a way to deal with the fact that the Sobolev space W1,1 is not a reflexive space; since W1,1 is not reflexive, it is not always true that a bounded sequence has a weakly convergent subsequence, which is a desideratum in many applications.

Definition

Let Ω be a bounded domain in n-dimensional Euclidean space with smooth boundary.  The Souček space W1,μ(Ω; Rm) is defined to be the space of all ordered pairs (u, v), where

 u lies in the Lebesgue space L1(Ω; Rm);
 v (thought of as the gradient of u) is a regular Borel measure on the closure of Ω;
 there exists a sequence of functions uk in the Sobolev space W1,1(Ω; Rm) such that

and

weakly-∗ in the space of all Rm×n-valued regular Borel measures on the closure of Ω.

Properties

 The Souček space W1,μ(Ω; Rm) is a Banach space when equipped with the norm given by

i.e. the sum of the L1 and total variation norms of the two components.

References

  

Banach spaces
Sobolev spaces